Seweryn Roman Kulesza (23 October 1900 in Radom – 14 May 1983 in Los Angeles, United States) was a Polish horse rider who competed in the 1936 Summer Olympics.

In 1936 he and his horse Tóska won the silver medal as part of the Polish eventing team, after finishing 21st in the individual eventing competition.

During WWII he took part in the Polish September Campaign, where he was captured by the Germans and spent the rest of the war in Oflag VII-A Murnau.

External links
profile 
dataOlympics profile

1900 births
1983 deaths
People from Radom
People from Radom Governorate
Polish male equestrians
Event riders
Olympic equestrians of Poland
Equestrians at the 1936 Summer Olympics
Olympic silver medalists for Poland
Olympic medalists in equestrian
Sportspeople from Masovian Voivodeship
Medalists at the 1936 Summer Olympics
Polish Army officers
Polish September Campaign participants
Polish prisoners of war in World War II